Bangwe is a town located in southern Malawi, situated between Mpingwe Hill and Malabvi, and is also nearby to Bangwe Hill.

References

Populated places in Malawi